Meenā Bāzār or Mina Bazaar is a special bazaar to sell items to raise money for charity and non-profit organizations. It also refers to a number of modern-day shopping centres and retail stores.

In the Mughal era
During the Mughal era Meena Bazaars, also known as Kuhs Ruz ("Day of Joy") were exclusively held for women, while the emperor and a few princes were the only males present.

The Bazaars took 5 to 8 days during the Norouz (New Year) festival. Emperor Humayun was the first to organize them, but Akbar and his successors made them more elaborate. Later the fair was closed for the public. Only the emperor, princes and some nobles were allowed to enter the bazaar.

Other
In India, Meena Bazar, refers also to a bazaar of the famous Qaisarbagh in the city of Lucknow in the Awadh region of the country. This bazaar was enjoyed by the royal ladies living in the Qaisarbagh complex of Nawab Wajid Ali Shah.

In Pakistan, the Meena Bazaars are organized by students of schools, colleges, universities, and other non-profit organizations to raise money for their activities.

In the United Arab Emirates, Meena Bazaar is the name of a well-known shopping location in Bur Dubai. Since 2000, Meena Bazaar is also becoming popular among tourists.

In Bangladesh, Meena Bazar is a well-known chain super shop.

In Birgunj, Nepal, Meena Bazar is a well-known traditional grocery market that stretches from Maisthan Temple to Ghantaghar(Clock Tower). It is the central market of Parsa District.

See also

References 

Akbar
Bazaars in India
Bazaars in Pakistan
Retail markets in the United Arab Emirates